Bellefeuille (also spelled with the de prefix) is a French-language surname. Notable people with the name include:

 Blake Bellefeuille (born 1977), American ice hockey center
 Claude DeBellefeuille (born 1963), Canadian politician, Bloc Québécois Member of Parliamen
 Marcel Bellefeuille (born c. 1966), Canadian football coach
 Normand de Bellefeuille (born 1949), Canadian poet, writer, literary critic, and essayist
 Pete Bellefeuille (1900–1970), Canadian
 Pierre de Bellefeuille (1923–2015), Canadian politician, Member of the National Assembly of Quebec

See also
Bellefeuille, Quebec

French-language surnames